Zeyheria is a genus of plants in the family Bignoniaceae.

Species include:

 Zeyheria montana
 Zeyheria tuberculosa Burman

References

 
Bignoniaceae genera
Taxonomy articles created by Polbot